The 1987–88 South Pacific cyclone season was a quiet tropical cyclone season with five tropical cyclones and 2 severe tropical cyclones, observed within the South Pacific basin to the east of 160°E.


Seasonal summary 

The 1987–88 season was a below-average tropical cyclone season with five named tropical cyclones, occurring within the South Pacific basin to the east of 160°E. The season was characterised by an El Niño event, which weakened and transitioned into a La Niña event, as the season progressed. During the season tropical cyclones were officially monitored by the Fiji Meteorological Service and the New Zealand Meteorological Service, while the United States Joint Typhoon Warning Center and Naval Pacific Meteorology and Oceanography Center also monitored the region. During December 1987, the South Pacific Convergence Zone started to intensify as upper level westerly winds appeared near the equator, with two depressions forming near Tuvalu towards the end of December as a result. Despite the low-level conditions being ideal for the development of a tropical cyclone at this stage, the surrounding upper-level conditions were unfavourable and the depressions dissipated while still in the low-latitudes. Tropical Cyclone 04P was monitored near Tuvalu, by the JTWC and the NPMOC between December 18–22. Over the next few days the system moved south-westwards through the northern Vanuatu Islands, before it moved into the Australian Region during January 6. The system was last noted during January 14, as it moved back into the basin as it interacted with Severe Tropical Cyclone Anne during that day.

After the season had ended, the names Anne and Bola were retired from the list of South Pacific tropical cyclone names, while the name Agi was retired from the List of Australian region tropical cyclone names.

Systems

Tropical Cyclone Agi 

Over the next few days the system moved south-westwards through the Northern Vanuatu Islands, before the JTWC initiated advisories on the system and designated it as Tropical Cyclone 06P during December 6. The system subsequently moved into the Australian region, where it was named Agi by the Papua New Guinea National Weather Service during January 11. After being named the system peaked as a Category 2 tropical cyclone, as it rapidly moved south-eastwards and started to interact with Severe Tropical Cyclone Anne. The system moved back into the South Pacific basin during January 14, where it continued to weaken and posed a threat to New Caledonia. The system was last noted later that day, as it merged with Anne near New Caledonia.

Severe Tropical Cyclone Anne 

 Over the next two days the system gradually developed further as it was steered towards the south — southwest, before it became equivalent to a tropical storm during January 7 while passing through the Tuvaluan Islands. As a result, the JTWC designated the system as Tropical Cyclone 07P and started to issue advisories on it, before the FMS reported early on January 8, that the system had become equivalent to a modern-day category 2 tropical cyclone on the Australian Scale and named it Anne As Anne continued to move south-westwards the cyclone's forward speed increased before it started to rapidly intensify during January 9, with the JTWC reporting during that day that the system had become equivalent to a category 1 hurricane on the SSHS.

Later on January 10, after it had become equivalent to a category 4 tropical cyclone on the SSHS, Anne directly passed over Vanuatu's Torres Islands and came within  of Ureparapara in the Banks Islands. Fortunately for the rest of Vanuatu though, Anne remained moving towards the south-westwards and only affected Northern Vanuatu. Over the next day, as the cyclone turned towards the south, Cyclone Anne rapidly weakened as it encountered upper-level vertical windshear and approached New Caledonia. After the cyclone had emerged into the Coral Sea, Anne continued to weaken, before it was last noted during January 14 by the FMS and the JTWC as it weakened into a depression and merged with Cyclone Agi.

The system was responsible for severe and/or extensive damage within the Solomon Islands Temotu Province, Vanuatu and New Caledonia, while it caused minor damage to houses and cash crops when it moved through the central islands of Tuvalu. Within Temotu there was no official quantitative damage assessment and prompt relief measures were not carried out due to the lack of boats or aircraft and the remoteness of the islands. Despite this Anuta, Utupua, the Duff Islands and the Reef Islands all reported extensive damage to property and crops. Within Vanuatu, torrential rain, flooding and storm surge caused damage to houses, crops, and property with severe damage recorded on the islands of Ureparapara and the Torres Islands, while extensive damage was recorded on the islands of Vanua Lava and Gaua. Extensive damage was also reported on New Caledonia after it was exposed to a prolonged period of storm force winds, with the eastern and southern coasts particularly affected. The system produced the highest daily rainfall totals since 1951 in several areas on January 12. Two people were killed after they attempted to cross a flooded river during January 13, while about 80 others were injured by the cyclone.

Severe Tropical Cyclone Bola 

On February 24, the FMS started to monitor a tropical depression, that had developed within the South Pacific Convergence Zone to the north-northeast of Suva, Fiji. During that day the system moved towards the southwest, before the JTWC initiated warnings on the system and designated it as Tropical Cyclone 13P. Over the next 2 days the system gradually developed tropical cyclone characteristics as it moved south-westwards and passed to the northwest of Fiji. Early on February 26, the FMS named the system Bola after it had become a category 1 tropical cyclone on the Australian scale. The system initially moved south-westwards which seemed to indicate to the Vanuatu Meteorological Service, that the islands of Maewo and Pentecost were in some danger. However, as Bola moved further southwards it entered a region of light and variable winds, which along with an area of high pressure in the Tasman Sea blocked Bola's movement southwards. As a result, the systems future movement became hard to predict early on February 27 as it became slow moving.

Severe Tropical Cyclone Cilla 

During the last week of February 1988, a shallow tropical depression developed within a trough of low pressure, between Aitutaki and Palmerston Island in the Southern Cook Islands. Over the next couple of days the system moved south-eastwards and gradually developed further, before the NPMOC designated the system as Tropical Cyclone 15P and initiated advisories on the system during February 28. During February 29, the depression was named Cilla, by the FMS after it had developed into a Category 1 tropical cyclone. The system subsequently gradually developed further as it continued its south-eastwards movement and came to within  of the Southern Cook Islands. Over the next few days, the system recurved southwards and moved into higher latitudes, before it dissipated during March 8. The system had a minimal effect on land areas, with the French Polynesian islands of Rūrutu and Tupua'i affected by gale-force winds.

Tropical Cyclone Dovi 

The final tropical cyclone of the season was first noted during April 8, as a tropical disturbance to the northeast of Vanuatu. Over the next day the system moved south-eastwards towards Vanuatu and gradually developed gale-force winds near its centre, before the JTWC initiated advisories on the depression and designated it as Tropical Cyclone 19P. The depression was subsequently named Dovi by the FMS during April 9, after it had become a Category 1 tropical cyclone and gale-force wind speeds had been confirmed by a report from Port Vila. During the next day the system performed a small anti-clockwise cyclonic loop and started to intensify further while attaining a better cloud organization. After it was named the system, slowly executed a double loop near Efate Island while intensifying further, before it restarted moving to the south-east during April 11.

Dovi peaked as a category 2 tropical cyclone during April 12, with 10-minute sustained windspeeds of 110 km/h (70 mph), while the JTWC reported that the system had peaked with 1-minute sustained wind speeds of 130 km/h (80 mph), which made it equivalent to a category 1 hurricane on the SSHWS. Over the next few days, Dovi gradually weakened gradually and became a depression during April 15, before the system was last noted to the south-east of Auckland, New Zealand during April 18. Within Vanuatu, minor damages were reported on various islands including Tanna, which had suffered damage from Anne and Bola earlier in the season. As a result, it was noted by the Vanuatu Meteorological Service that such damage could have been missed.

Seasonal effects

Notes

See also 

 Atlantic hurricane seasons: 1987, 1988
 Eastern Pacific hurricane seasons: 1987, 1988
 Western Pacific typhoon seasons: 1987, 1988
 North Indian Ocean cyclone seasons: 1987, 1988

References

External links 

 Trackmap of Severe Tropical Cyclone Anne from the Vanuatu Meteorological Service
 Trackmap of Severe Tropical Cyclone Bola from the Vanuatu Meteorological Service
 Trackmap of Tropical Cyclone Dovi from the Vanuatu Meteorological Service

 
South Pacific cyclone seasons
Articles which contain graphical timelines
Tropical cyclones in 1987
Tropical cyclones in 1988